Viva Air Dominicana S.A. was a Dominican airline based at Las Américas International Airport in Santo Domingo, with flights to San Juan, Curaçao and other Caribbean islands from Santo Domingo, Santiago, and Punta Cana.

The company went out of service in 2009.

Fleet
3 Cessna 401
1 Jetstream 31

References

Defunct airlines of the Dominican Republic
Airlines disestablished in 2009